Ek Ladki Ko Dekha Toh Aisa Laga is a 2019 Indian Hindi-language coming-of-age romantic comedy-drama film directed by Shelly Chopra Dhar. The screenplay was written by Dhar and Gazal Dhaliwal, with the story inspired by the 1919 novel A Damsel in Distress by P. G. Wodehouse. It stars Anil Kapoor, Sonam K Ahuja, Rajkummar Rao and Juhi Chawla, and features Abhishek Duhan, Madhumalti Kapoor, Seema Pahwa, Brijendra Kala, Alka Kaushal and Kanwaljit Singh in supporting roles. Akshay Oberoi and Regina Cassandra make special appearances in the film. The film tells the story of Sweety Chaudhary, a closeted lesbian, and her attempts to come out to her conservative and traditional Punjabi family.

The film is the first collaboration between real-life father and daughter Anil Kapoor and Sonam K Ahuja, and marks the Bollywood debut of Regina Cassandra.  It was released worldwide on 1 February 2019. The screenplay was selected by the Academy of Motion Picture Arts and Sciences for its library's Core Collection.

Plot
A young Punjabi woman, Sweety Chaudhary, is under pressure from her traditional family to marry. She meets a young woman named Kuhu and Kuhu's brother Raza at a wedding. A year passes. In Delhi, Sahil Mirza is a playwright though not very successful, and his father, a famous film producer, thinks he should give up being a playwright. Sweety sees a rehearsal of his latest play and remarks that it is amusing but the romance is superficial. A man comes chasing her, and Sahil helps her flee. She escapes while Sahil fights the man, and Sahil accidentally hits a policeman. At the police station, Sahil learns that the man is Sweety's brother Babloo, and they live in Chaudhary Manor, Moga, Punjab. Sahil wants to see Sweety again and decides to write his next play in Moga. He is joined by Chatro, a caterer and enthusiastic amateur actress.

Sweety and Babloo's single father, Balbir Chaudhary, runs Chaudhary Garments, a clothing company. He actually wanted to become a cook, but his mother Beeji insists men do not belong in the kitchen. Babloo claims that Sweety has been going to Delhi to see a Muslim boy, so she must not be allowed to leave the house. Sahil goes to the manor with a letter for her. He sees Balbir cooking. Incorrectly assuming Balbir is the cook, Sahil pays him to give the letter to Sweety. This convinces Balbir that Sahil is Sweety's Muslim boyfriend. Sahil next pays Balbir's employee Chaubey to pass along a message to Sweety, and Chaubey tells Sahil that Sweety loves him though the family disapproves of her dating him because he is Muslim. A few individuals employed by the family bet on who Sweety will marry, with the cook Billauri betting on someone from a matchmaking app. Chaubey bets on “Mr. X”, any unknown outsider. Sweety learns Sahil is holding acting classes, and goes with Beeji and Billauri to the class. Sahil and Chatro are invited to Beeji's birthday party the following day.

At Beeji's party, Chatro bonds with Balbir over cooking. He notices Sahil enjoying the party and tells the others that Sahil is Sweety's Muslim boyfriend. Chaubey hides Sahil and brings him to Sweety's room. Sahil says he loves her. She tells him Babloo lied and she is actually in love with a girl. Sahil is astonished and too drunk to properly respond. The next day, he cancels the acting class. Billauri saw Chaubey taking Sahil to Sweety's room and blackmails him into exchanging their bets. She helps Sweety see Sahil again. Sweety explains that she did not fit in as a child and now she hides the truth about herself. She is in a relationship with Kuhu. Babloo discovered this and tried to stop it, but she continued to see Kuhu in Delhi. She is glad to have a friend to confide in, and Sahil is glad to be her friend. Sweety wants to join Kuhu in London and study art there, yet she does not want to run away from her family. Chatro tells Balbir she is divorced with kids, and feels her kids should be free to marry or not, and to marry whomever they want to, regardless of religion. This inspires Balbir to invite Sahil to dinner and announce Sweety's engagement to him, which Babloo encourages.

Sweety resolves to marry Sahil to make her family happy, though Sahil is against this. Sahil's supportive mother reminds him about a successful play he wrote that was based on a true story. He offers to write a play for Balbir's upcoming fashion show, with Balbir, Chatro, and the others as the actors. Sahil writes a romance titled Ek Ladki Ko Dekha Toh Aisa Laga, which will star Sweety and Kuhu. Balbir at first finds the story absurd, but Sahil defends it as a fresh new story. Babloo is supposed to be away but finds out about the play and reveals Sweety is actually in a relationship with Kuhu, not Sahil. Balbir leaves angrily, though Sweety declares the show will go on. As it becomes apparent the play is about a romance between two women, members of the audience start to leave, though many remain. After Balbir reads Sweety's diary and sees how she has felt lonely and misunderstood, he returns to the stage to defend Sweety and Kuhu. He is now accepting and supportive. The audience applauds. Later, Sahil's father congratulates him on his fresh new play. Sweety suggests Sahil present the play in other places for others like her. Balbir opens a restaurant and starts a relationship with Chatro. Billauri, claiming the gender of “Mr. X” is irrelevant, wins the bet on who Sweety would marry.

Cast

Production
Principal photography began in Patiala on 29 January 2018. Initially, Anil Kapoor began filming and Sonam Kapoor joined the production shortly thereafter. It is produced by Vidhu Vinod Chopra under the banner of Vinod Chopra Films.

The film's title is derived from a similarly named song from the 1994 film 1942: A Love Story, which also stars Anil Kapoor. Ek Ladki Ko Dekha Toh Aisa Laga marks the reunion, after 11 years, of Anil Kapoor and Juhi Chawla, one of India's popular onscreen couples.

Release

Ek Ladki Ko Dekha Toh Aisa Laga was released on 1 February 2019 on 1,500 screens in domestic circuit. The film is distributed by Fox Star Studios, and received a 12A certification from the British Board of Film Classification.

Reception

Critical response

Saibal Chatterjee of NDTV gave it four stars out of five and wrote, "In the context of a commercial filmmaking tradition that has usually been appallingly uncaring of LGBTQ sensibilities, Ek Ladki Ko Dekha... is a whiff of fresh air, a huge leap forward from 2008's Dostana.  It does not seek to derive mirth and frivolity from the theme, offering instead an earnest, unapologetic depiction of the act of coming out in a conservative society." He found the story "simple enough and is told in a manner that could be faulted for being overly chaste — the same-sex lovers embrace a few times but they do not as much as plant a kiss on each other's cheeks, let alone lips — but the film achieves something far bigger than a Bollywood crowd-pleaser can....[It]...goads the audience to think differently without trying to deviate from its primary purpose, which is to deliver entertainment."

Gaurang Chauhan of Times Now rated the film three and a half stars out of five, and although he faulted the comedic conflict of Sweety being mistaken by her family as "in love with a 'musalmaan'", he concluded that "Overall, Ek Ladki Ko Dekha Toh Aisa Laga is an important, well-intended film that is high on entertainment, boasts of great performances and rightfully deserves all the applause."

Ananya Bhattacharya of India Today gave it four stars out of five, opining, "Ek Ladki Ko Dekha Toh Aisa Laga sets out to smash our ideas of right and wrong....It is an important film for the times we live in....Sonam Kapoor and Anil Kapoor, along with writer Gazal Dhaliwal and director Shelly Chopra Dhar, deliver a brilliant lesbian love story that Bollywood should be proud of."

Film critic Taran Adarsh gave the film three stars out of five, and said it was "brave" and "will surely trigger debates about love and life...."

Box office
Ek Ladki Ko Dekha Toh Aisa Laga collected 2.90 crore on the first day of release. The first week earned 17.19 crore in domestic circuit. The film grossed 26 crore in the domestic market and 13.86 crore in the overseas market, for a combined worldwide gross of 39.86 crore. Box Office Mojo reported a total  worldwide gross as of 24 February 2019. It was a major flop at the box office.

Home media
The film became available as VOD on Netflix on 2 April 2019.

Soundtrack

The music for the film was composed by Rochak Kohli, while the music of the title song was originally written by R.D. Burman for the film 1942: A Love Story, and the lyrics rewritten by Gurpreet Saini. The soundtrack album was released by Saregama on 8 January 2019.

See also
 Fire (1996)
 The Journey (2004)
 Homosexuality in India

Notes

References

Further reading

External links
 
 
  Ek Ladki Ko Dekha Toh Aisa Laga at BBFC

 

2019 films
2019 comedy-drama films
2019 LGBT-related films
2019 romantic comedy-drama films
2010s musical comedy-drama films
Indian musical comedy-drama films
Indian romantic comedy-drama films
Indian LGBT-related films
Lesbian-related films
LGBT-related coming-of-age films
LGBT-related musical comedy-drama films
LGBT-related romantic comedy-drama films
Films set in Punjab, India
Fox Star Studios films